Shooting was contested at the 2007 Summer Universiade from August 10 to 13 in Bangkok, Thailand.

Medal summary

Men's events

Individual

Team

Women's events

Individual

Team

References

External links
 2007 Summer Universiade Results

2007 in shooting sports
2007 Summer Universiade
Shooting at the Summer Universiade